Charles Henry "Rabbit" McVeigh (March 29, 1898 — May 7, 1984) was a Canadian professional ice hockey player who played 397 games in the National Hockey League with the Chicago Black Hawks and New York Americans between 1926 and 1935. He also was a veteran in Canada who fought in the First World War.

His nickname "Rabbit" came from his speed combined with his ability to jump the sticks of opponent players.

He was the last surviving former player of the Portland Rosebuds.

Hearing loss
McVeigh's service with the 16th Canadian Infantry in the First World War damaged his hearing, and while he was not legally deaf he had problems hearing everyday speech unless the speaker raised the voice well above its normal pitch and spoke into his less damaged ear. He was also injured in his knees and in the chest, while with the overseas forces.

Career statistics

Regular season and playoffs

References

Notes

External links

1898 births
1984 deaths
Canadian ice hockey centres
Chicago Blackhawks players
Ice hockey people from Ontario
London Tecumsehs players
National Hockey League officials
New York Americans players
Portland Rosebuds players
Regina Capitals players
Sportspeople from Kenora
Winnipeg Victorias players